The Vermin is a punk rock band from Las Vegas, Nevada. The band formed in 1984 (1986 in some sources) as Vermin From Venus by singer and guitarist Dirk Vermin, and was noted for releasing one of the first independent punk rock albums in Las Vegas, Sex on Planet X. In 1994, Vermin and bassist Rob Ruckus formed a punk cover band called Godboy, and in 1995 the bands merged, adopting the name The Vermin. The band recorded their first album under their new name, Hell or Las Vegas, in 1996 with drummer Anthony Hudak, but Hudak left the band soon after and was immediately replaced with current drummer Gerry "Turbo" Proctor. The band was featured in the low-budget horror film Trans-American Killer in 2005. Singer Dirk Vermin opened Pussykat Tattoo in 1999; the shop, Vermin, and bassist Ruckus are currently featured in the A&E program Bad Ink.

Discography

Albums
Sex on Planet X (1989) (as Vermin From Venus)
Push and Shove (1994) (as Vermin From Venus)
Hell or Las Vegas (1996)
The Vermin Vs. You! (1998)
Loose Women, Hard Livin' and the Devil (2000)
Joe's Shanghai (2008)

Singles and EPs
Attack of the Killer Virgin Prom Queen (1986) (as Vermin From Venus)
Neat Damned Noise (1996)
The Exciting Sounds of Al Martino (2009)

Compilations
A Fist Full of Hell (2006)

Band members

Current
Dirk Vermin – lead vocals, guitar
Rob Ruckus – bass, vocals
Gerry "Turbo" Proctor – drums, vocals

Former
Anthony Hudak – drums
Dave Sorensen – bass 
Miles Francis – bass 
Paul Summers, Jr. – lead guitar 
Derek Weishaupt – drums 
Kelly Clark – lead guitar

References

External links

 The Vermin on ReverbNation

American punk rock groups
Musical groups from Las Vegas